Walter Santos (born 1 January 1982) is a heavyweight judoka from Brazil. He won three gold and one silver medals at the Pan American Championships in 2005 and 2008.

References

External links

 

1982 births
Living people
Brazilian male judoka
20th-century Brazilian people
21st-century Brazilian people